Kho Kho events were held from 30 September 2022 to 4 October 2022 at Sanskardham Ground, Venue 2, Ahmedabad.

Medal table

Medal summary
Men's Team
Gold🥇 Maharashtra 
Silver🥈 Kerala 
Bronze🥉 Karnataka 
Bronze🥉 West Bengal

Women's Team
Gold🥇 Maharashtra 
Silver🥈 Odisha 
Bronze🥉 Delhi
Bronze🥉 Karnataka

References

2022 National Games of India
Kho-Kho